Green Chains is a 1970 Soviet adventure film directed by Grigori Aronov.

Plot 
The film takes place in the summer of 1941. Styopa and Misha return to their native Leningrad from a pioneer camp and meet a one-armed man on the way, whom they decide to help. Suddenly, a bombardment begins, which tears them apart, and the luggage of the man remains with the guys. Returning to Leningrad, they open their suitcase and find fascist missiles there, as a result of which they go in search of a one-armed man.

Cast 
 Aleksandr Grigoryev as Mishka Alakseyev
 Igor Urumbekov as Vaska Kozhukh
 Vladimir Leletko as Styopka Panfilov
 Pavel Luspekayev as Ivan Vasilyevich
 Oleg Belov as Alesey Burakov
 Aleksey Mikhaylov
 Fyodor Odinokov as Semyon Semyonov (as F. Odinokov)
 Andrey Krupenin as Shurka
 Aristarkh Livanov as Zhorka
 Aleksandr Lipov as Valeriy Kuplanov

References

External links 
 

1970 films
1970s Russian-language films
Soviet adventure films
1970s adventure films